Cesare Facchinetti (17 September 1608 – 30 January 1683) was an Italian Catholic Cardinal.

Early life

Facchinetti was born 17 September 1608 in Bologna. He was the son of Ludovico Facchinetti (2nd Marquis of Vianino), Senator of Bologna, Ambassador of Bologna to the Holy See) and Violante da Correggio (Countess of Coenzo). He was the great-grand-nephew of Gian Facchinetti, who took the papal throne in 1591 as Pope Innocent IX.

Ecclesiastic career

He went to Rome in 1632 and became Referendary of the Tribunals of the Apostolic Signatura. Thereafter he was sent to Spain as an apostolic nuncio. Upon his return, he was elevated to Cardinal on 13 July 1643 by Pope Urban VIII and was installed as Cardinal-Priest at the Santi Quattro Coronati basilica.

Facchinetti was popular with the other cardinals of the college and there was discussion, according to contemporary John Bargrave, that he might be considered papabile - that is, appropriate for election as pope. This did not eventuate, though he remained popular with the Spanish faction within the college and the French faction had no considerable objection to him.

As a result of his popularity, his family members were appointed to various military and administrative positions. His brother, for example, was appointed as commander of the militia by Pope Innocent X during the second War of Castro.

In 1671 he was appointed Cardinal-Priest at San Lorenzo in Lucina, in 1672 at Cardinal-Bishop of Palestrina and in 1679 Cardinal-Bishop of Porto e S. Rufina. At the death of Francesco Barberini (10 December 1679) he became Dean of the College of Cardinals and in the consistory of 8 January 1680 Innocent XI appointed him Bishop of Ostia e Velletri, Secretary of the Roman Inquisition and administrator of the Apostolic Chancery, positions he held until his death.

Facchinetti participated in every papal conclave between 1644 and 1676 including 1644, 1655, 1667, 1669–1670 and 1676.

He died 30 January 1683 in Rome.

Episcopal succession

References

1608 births
1683 deaths
Clergy from Bologna
17th-century Italian cardinals
Cardinals created by Pope Urban VIII
Cardinal-bishops of Palestrina